Robert Leonard Larson (September 20, 1898 – October 6, 1986) was a justice of the Iowa Supreme Court from February 9, 1953, to April 1, 1971, appointed from Johnson County, Iowa. He was previously Attorney General of Iowa from 1947 to 1953.

Personal life
Larson was born in Fairfield, Iowa and graduated from Parsons College in 1921.  He served in the U.S. Navy during World War I.  He later attended the University of Chicago before receiving his J.D. degree from the University of Iowa in 1930.  While at Iowa he was initiated into Sigma Pi fraternity.

After graduating he practiced law in Iowa City until 1943 while also teaching at public schools in Wapello and Anamosa.  From 1937 to 1941 he was the city attorney of Iowa City and on the Johnson County Republican Central Committee.

Larson was a member of the American Legion, Freemasons, Shriners, the American Bar Association, and the Rotary.

He was married and had four children.

Government
Larson began serving as the assistant attorney general of Iowa in 1943.  He was appointed as the state's attorney general in 1947 to fill the unexpired term of John M. Rankin.  He was elected to the office in 1948 and served until 1953.

In 1952 he turned down an opportunity to run for governor.

In 1953, he was appointed to the Iowa Supreme Court by Governor William S. Beardsley.  He served a six-month term as the Chief Justice in 1955.  He became the first permanent Chief Justice from 1959 to 1961.

Notable cases
Katko v. Briney while an associate justice of the Iowa Supreme Court.

References

External links

Iowa Attorneys General
Justices of the Iowa Supreme Court
1898 births
1986 deaths
20th-century American judges
Chief Justices of the Iowa Supreme Court
United States Navy personnel of World War I